Demon Creek is a stream in Nome Census Area, Alaska, in the United States.

Demon Creek was likely named by prospectors in or before 1908, the year in which the name was added to maps.

See also
 List of rivers of Alaska

References

Rivers of the Seward Peninsula
Rivers of Alaska
Rivers of Nome Census Area, Alaska
Rivers of Unorganized Borough, Alaska